Lance Ten Broeck (born March 21, 1956) is an American professional golfer who has played on the PGA Tour, Nationwide Tour, and Champions Tour.

Early life
Ten Broeck was born in Chicago, Illinois, and grew up in Beverly, a community on the city's southwest side. He attended the University of Texas, and was a member of the golf team from 1975–1976. He was a two-time All-American and winner of the Massingill trophy in 1975. He turned pro in 1977.

Career
Ten Broeck played in 349 PGA Tour events in his career making the cut 159 times including ten top-10 finishes. His best finish in an official PGA Tour event was a stand-alone 2nd at the 1991 Chattanooga Classic. His best finish in a major was a T-31 at the 1991 U.S. Open. He won the 1984 Magnolia State Classic before that tournament became an official PGA Tour event.

After his playing days were over, Ten Broeck began work as a caddie. His clients have included several big name players – notably Robert Allenby and Jesper Parnevik. Since Ten Broeck made more than 150 cuts in his career on the PGA Tour, he is a veteran member of the tour, near the bottom of the list in eligibility. He frequently commits to playing in events in which he is scheduled to caddie, just in case the unlikely happens and more players drop out than there are alternates at the course.  In 2008, he returned to the PGA Tour for the first time since 1998 in the Legends Reno-Tahoe Open, a tournament played opposite the WGC-Bridgestone Invitational. In May 2009, he caddied and played in the Valero Texas Open, missing the cut but beating Jesper Parnevik who he caddied for. He attempted to repeat the feat in February 2010 at the Mayakoba Golf Classic at Riviera Maya-Cancun. He caddied for Richard S. Johnson in the morning then played in the afternoon (replacing Notah Begay III). After shooting 5-over-par, he withdrew from playing the second round.

Ten Broeck has earned more in his best season working as a caddie ($235,000) than in his best season as a player ($146,568 in 1989).

In 2008, Ten Broeck played in his first Champions Tour event at the 3M Championship.  His best finish in a Champions Tour event was a T-9 in the 2012 U.S. Senior Open.

Personal life
Ten Broeck lives on Singer Island in Palm Beach County, Florida.

Professional wins
1984 Magnolia State Classic, Illinois Open Championship (non-PGA Tour events)

Results in major championships

Note: The only major Ten Broeck played was the U.S. Open.

CUT = missed the half-way cut
"T" = tied

See also
Fall 1979 PGA Tour Qualifying School graduates
Fall 1981 PGA Tour Qualifying School graduates
1987 PGA Tour Qualifying School graduates
1988 PGA Tour Qualifying School graduates

References

External links

American male golfers
Texas Longhorns men's golfers
PGA Tour golfers
PGA Tour Champions golfers
American caddies
Golfers from Chicago
Golfers from Florida
American people of Dutch descent
People from Palm Beach County, Florida
1956 births
Living people